Maşadqanlı (known as Birinci Aratkənd until 1992) is a village and municipality in the Agsu Rayon of Azerbaijan. It has a population of 523.

References

Populated places in Agsu District